Hervé Delesie (born 9 January 1951) is a Belgian footballer. He played in one match for the Belgium national football team in 1976.

References

External links
 

1951 births
Living people
Belgian footballers
Belgium international footballers
Place of birth missing (living people)
Association football midfielders